A Whole New Level of Sickness is a split EP featuring songs by hardcore punk bands Shai Hulud and Another Victim, released on June 27, 2000, on Trustkill Records and, in Europe, Good Life Recordings, in CD and 12" various colors from brown swirl to purple (150 pressed). Shai Hulud tracks were included in A Profound Hatred of Man (reissue). It also is the debut of Jared Allen and Geert van der Velde.

Track listing
 "Set Your Body Ablaze" – 3:40 (Shai Hulud)
 "Anesthesia" (Bad Religion cover) – 2:46 (Shai Hulud)
 "Linoleum" (NOFX cover) – 2:08 (Shai Hulud)
 "Bitter End" – 2:49 (Another Victim)
 "Boiling Point" (SSD cover) – 1:40 (Another Victim)
 "Free In Constraint" – 2:48 (Another Victim)
 "Untitled Track" – 0:58 (Another Victim, Shai Hulud)

- The Untitled Track is not a real song; it is various members of both bands screaming the word "burn" for 58 seconds.

Personnel

Shai Hulud line-up
Jared Allen – bass guitar
Matt Fletcher –  guitar
Matt Fox –  guitar
Spikey Goldbach – drums
Geert van der Velde – voice

Tracks were recorded and mixed by Shai Hulud and Jeremy Staska.

Shai Hulud albums
Albums produced by Jeremy Staska
Split EPs
2000 EPs
Trustkill Records EPs
Good Life Recordings EPs